Patricia Kombo is a youth climate activist in Kenya. She is best known for her tree planting initiatives as part of her nonprofit PaTree Initiative. The initiative has planted over 10,000 trees as of 2020. For this work, Kombo has been named a United Nations Convention to Combat Desertification Land Hero.

Kombo is originally from Mbooni, Makueni County. Kombo studied journalism at Moi University.

In 2022, she challenged world leaders during the Opening session of Conference Of Parties to United Nations Convention To Combat Desertification in Côte d'Ivoire .

References 

Kenyan activists
Climate activists
Moi University alumni
People from Makueni County
Year of birth missing (living people)
Living people